It's All True is the fourth studio album by Canadian electronic music duo Junior Boys. The album was released on June 13, 2011.

Release
On March 11, 2011, Junior Boys announced they were releasing their fourth studio album.

Critical reception
It's All True was met with "generally favorable" reviews from critics. At Metacritic, which assigns a weighted average rating out of 100 to reviews from mainstream publications, this release received an average score of 78 based on 30 reviews. Aggregate website AnyDecentMusic? gave the release a 7.5 out of 10 based on a critical consensus of 29 reviews.

In a review for AllMusic, critic reviewer Andy Kellman wrote: "For all the sonic shimmer, not much exposure is needed to realize that the album concerns an embittering relationship. The duo’s sound is remarkably amorphous, inviting countless comparisons and context placements across several decades and styles."

Track listing

Charts

References

2011 albums
Junior Boys albums
Domino Recording Company albums